Thiago Couto Wenceslau (born 26 March 1999) is a Brazilian professional footballer who plays for Esporte Clube Juventude as a goalkeeper.

Career statistics

Club

Notes

References

External links

1999 births
Living people
Association football goalkeepers
Brazilian footballers
São Paulo FC players
Footballers from São Paulo